St. Peter F.C. is a football club based on the Channel Island of Jersey. They are affiliated to the Jersey Football Association and play in the Jersey Football Combination Premiership. The club hosted matches during the 2015 Island Games, including the 3rd/4th place play off match.

References

External links
Official website

Football clubs in Jersey